Julius Sumaye (born 12 September 1964) is a Tanzanian long-distance runner. He competed in the men's marathon at the 1996 Summer Olympics.

References

External links
 

1964 births
Living people
Athletes (track and field) at the 1996 Summer Olympics
Tanzanian male long-distance runners
Tanzanian male marathon runners
Olympic athletes of Tanzania
Place of birth missing (living people)
Olympic male marathon runners